Konda language may refer to:
Konda language (Papuan), a language of West Papua, Indonesia
Konda language (Dravidian), a language of India
Konda, a dialect of the Khanty language of Russia, see Khanty language#Varieties
Konda, a dialect of the Mongo language, spoken in the Democratic Republic of the Congo
Konda, a dialect of the Ngwo language, spoken in Cameroon